Kiss Bang Love is an Australian reality dating television series on the Seven Network which premiered on 24 May 2016 at 8:45pm. The series is produced by the makers of Married at First Sight and based on a Danish format of the same name.

The series debuted to low ratings, coming fourth in its timeslot and the viewership continued to fall lower throughout the series, described as a "ratings flop". Shortly after the final episode aired, the Seven Network confirmed the program would not be renewed.
Repeats aired on Sunday afternoons on 7flix in December 2020.

Premise
Six singles are matched with 12 potential partners. Most are strangers but some are acquaintances or former lovers. The couples skip awkward dates and instead try to kiss each other before deciding whom to take on a romantic weekend holiday.

Episodes

Season 1 (2016)

International adaptations
In July 2016, American channel fyi commissioned 10 episodes of the series. The series debuted on 3 January 2017 rating 167,000 viewers. In Germany premiered on ProSieben.

References

External links

2016 Australian television series debuts
2016 Australian television series endings
Australian dating and relationship reality television series
Seven Network original programming
English-language television shows